Westerman is a surname. Notable people with the surname include:

Alan Westerman (1913–2001), senior Australian public servant
Alex Westerman (born 1969), American Creative Director
Bruce Westerman (born 1967), U.S. representative for Arkansas' 4th congressional district
Chantal Westerman, American actress and television correspondent
Floyd "Red Crow" Westerman (1936–2007), Lakota musician, songwriter, and actor
Gwen Westerman, a Dakota educator, writer and artist
Joe Westerman (born 1989), English rugby league footballer
John F. C. Westerman (1901-1991), English children's books author
Harold Westerman (1917-2011), American college football and basketball coach
Helen Westerman (1926-2006), All American Girls Professional Baseball League player
Percy F. Westerman (1876–1959), English children's books author
Sian Westerman (born 1962), British banker and fashion industry supporter
Tom Westerman Wolf (born 1948), governor of Pennsylvania

See also
Westerman, West Virginia
Westermann